Fissolimbus is a fungal genus in the family Marasmiaceae. This is a monotypic genus, containing the single species Fissolimbus fallaciosus, found in Papua New Guinea. The genus and species were described as new to science in 1979.

See also
 List of Agaricales genera
 List of Marasmiaceae genera

References

 

Marasmiaceae
Monotypic Agaricales genera
Fungi of New Guinea